Tunduru District is one of the five districts in the Ruvuma Region of Tanzania.  It is bordered to the north by the Lindi Region, to the east by the Mtwara Region, to the south by Mozambique and to the west by the Namtumbo District.

, the population of the Tunduru District was 247,976.

Administrative subdivisions
Tunduru District is administratively divided into seven divisions and twenty-four wards.

Divisions
The divisions are:
 Namsakata
 Nampungu
 Nalasi
 Matemanga
 Nakapanya
 Lukumbule
 Mlingoti (comprising the whole of Tunduru township)

Wards
The wards are:

 Kalulu
 Kidodoma
 Ligoma
 Ligunga
 Lukumbule
 Marumba
 Matemanga
 Mbesa

 Mchesi
 Mchoteka
 Mindu
 Misechela
 Mlingoti Magharibi (West)
 Mlingoti Mashariki (East)
 Mtina
 Muhuwesi

 Nakapanya
 Nalasi
 Namasakata
 Nampungu
 Namwinyu
 Nandembo
 Ngapa
 Tuwemacho

Notes

Districts of Ruvuma Region

sv:Tunduru